Italy competed at the 1987 World Championships in Athletics in Rome, Italy from 7–14 August 1987.

Medalists

Finalists
Italy national athletics team ranked 6th (with 13 finalists) in the IAAF placing table. Rank obtained by assigning eight points in the first place and so on to the eight finalists.

Results

Men (35)

Women (21)

References

External links
2ND IAAF WORLD CHAMPIONSHIPS IN ATHLETICS

Nations at the 1987 World Championships in Athletics
World Championships in Athletics
Italy at the World Championships in Athletics